All the Angels (full title All the Angels: Handel and the First Messiah) is a 2015 play with music by the British poet Nick Drake treating the 1742 Dublin premiere of Handel's Messiah and the actor-singer Susannah Cibber's involvement in it. Other historical figures such as the work's librettist Charles Jennens, the music historian Charles Burney and the soprano Christina Maria Avoglio also appear. It draws its name from Let all the angels of God worship Him, the chorus of Part II, Scene 4 from Messiah, itself quoting and titled after Hebrews 1:6.

It briefly premiered from 26 June to 6 July 2015 at the Sam Wanamaker Theatre, directed by Jonathan Munby, followed by a longer run at the same venue from 6 December 2016 to 12 February 2017. In both productions Handel was played by David Horovitch, Cibber by Kelly Price and the choric figure of Crazy Crow by Sean Campion, with the music sung by members of Genesis Sixteen, the training programme of the choir The Sixteen.

Notes

References

2015 plays
George Frideric Handel in fiction
Cultural depictions of George Frideric Handel
Biographical plays about musicians
Plays set in the 18th century
Plays based on music
Plays based on real people
Plays set in Dublin (city)